Kim Won-ho (Hangul: 김원호; born 2 June 1999) is a South Korean badminton player. Kim who was educated at the Maewon High School, competed at the 2016 Asian Junior Championships, and won the silver medals in the mixed doubles and team event. He was also a bronze medalist at the 2017 World Junior Championships in the boys' doubles and team event. Kim is the son of the Olympic gold medalist Gil Young-ah. He was the youngest player from the Korean national team who competed at the 2017 Sudirman Cup. He played one match, in the opening tie with Russia in the round robin stage. In the final round, Korea won the title after beating China by the score of 3–2. He represented Korea in the 2018 Thomas Cup but lost the match against Indonesia and therefore eliminated in the quarterfinals.

Achievements

Asian Championships 
Men's doubles

World Junior Championships 
Boys' doubles

Asian Junior Championships 
Mixed doubles

BWF World Tour (1 title, 5 runners-up) 
The BWF World Tour, which was announced on 19 March 2017 and implemented in 2018, is a series of elite badminton tournaments sanctioned by the Badminton World Federation (BWF). The BWF World Tour is divided into levels of World Tour Finals, Super 1000, Super 750, Super 500, Super 300, and the BWF Tour Super 100.

Men's doubles

Mixed doubles

BWF Grand Prix (2 titles, 3 runners-up) 
The BWF Grand Prix had two levels, the Grand Prix and Grand Prix Gold. It was a series of badminton tournaments sanctioned by the Badminton World Federation (BWF) and played between 2007 and 2017.

Men's doubles

Mixed doubles

  BWF Grand Prix Gold tournament
  BWF Grand Prix tournament

BWF International Challenge/Series (3 titles) 
Men's doubles

Mixed doubles

  BWF International Challenge tournament
  BWF International Series tournament

References

External links 
 

1999 births
Living people
People from Suwon
Sportspeople from Gyeonggi Province
South Korean male badminton players
Badminton players at the 2018 Asian Games
Asian Games competitors for South Korea